Castelnau-de-Montmiral is a commune in the Tarn department in southern France.

Demography

Geography

The Vère flows westward through the commune.

History

While traces of activities dating back to the Bronze Age such as dolmens and oppidums can be seen in the nearby forest La Grésigne, the village was founded as an albigensian bastide (fortified new town) in 1222 by Raymond VII, count of Toulouse, under the name “Castellum Novum Montis Mirabilis”.

During the subsequent years, the village remained an impressive stronghold. In 1345, during the Hundred Years' War, when Edward the Black Prince invaded the Albigeois, he reportedly left without besieging the village… Later, it served as a shelter for Catholics who were fleeing from Gaillac because of the Wars of Religion.
King Louis XIII visited Castelnau in June 1622, and stayed in the “Tonnac” house.

Remarkable sites and monuments

Remarkable sites and monuments in Castelnau-de-Montmiral include :

 the village itself, listed among «Les Plus Beaux Villages de France »
 the central square surrounded by corbel vaults, with an ancient pillory
 the Notre Dame de l’Assomption church, with a 16th-century bell
 ancient stone houses and half-timbered houses
 the ramparts
 the Reliquary cross, created in 1341 by a goldsmith in Albi
 the nearby forest La Grésigne

Cultural references 

 Intellectuals Jean-Paul Sartre and Simone de Beauvoir once visited the village. Here are her comments :
“One evening, a small, jolting, overcrowded bus took us to Castelnau-de-Montmiral; it was raining; as we got out on the square surrounded by corbel vaults, Sartre abruptly told that he was fed up with being mad.” ("Un soir, un petit autobus cahotant et bondé nous amena à Castelnau de Montmiral; il pleuvait; en descendant sur la place entourée d’arcades, Sartre me dit abruptement qu’il en avait assez d’être fou.")
 In the American TV series Smallville, Lana Lang’s family comes from Castelnau-de-Montmiral.

See also
 Communes of the Tarn department
 Tourism in Tarn

References

Communes of Tarn (department)
Plus Beaux Villages de France
1222 establishments in Europe
1220s establishments in France
Populated places established in the 1220s